José Cândido da Silveira is a Belo Horizonte Metro station on Line 1. It was opened in April 1997 as part of a two-station extension of the line from Santa Inês to Minas Shopping. The station is located between Santa Inês and Minas Shopping.

References

Belo Horizonte Metro stations
1997 establishments in Brazil
Railway stations opened in 1997